Periwinkle may refer to:

Fauna
 Periwinkle, a common name for a number of gastropod molluscs in the family Littorinidae
 Common periwinkle (Littorina littorea)
 Austrolittorina unifasciata 
 Periwinkle, a regional name for the caddisfly larva
 Tegula pfeifferi

Flora
 Catharanthus or Madagascar periwinkles
Catharanthus roseus or rosy periwinkle
 Vinca or European periwinkles
Vinca major or greater periwinkle
Vinca minor or lesser periwinkle
Vinca herbacea or herbaceous periwinkle

Arts and entertainment
Periwinkle (film), a 1917 silent film by James Kirkwood
 Tribulation Periwinkle, protagonist of Hospital Sketches, an 1863 compilation of sketches by Louisa May Alcott
 Periwinkle, a character in Blue's Clues
 Periwinkle, a character in The Bellflower Bunnies
 Periwinkle, a character in the 2012 animated film Secret of the Wings from Disney, Tinker Bell's twin sister
 Periwinkle, the main character in Patricia A. McKillip's book The Changeling Sea

People
 Pauline Periwinkle (1863-1916), American journalist, poet, teacher, feminist

Other uses
Periwinkle (color), a pale shade of blue
, a Royal Navy corvette that served in the Second World War
USS Periwinkle (1864), a steamer procured by the Union Navy during the American Civil War
Periwinkle Run, a stream in Ohio

Animal common name disambiguation pages